East Midlands/Leicestershire 3 was a tier 11 English Rugby Union league with teams from Bedfordshire, parts of Cambridgeshire, Leicestershire and Northamptonshire taking part.  Promoted teams moved up to East Midlands/Leicestershire 2 and relegated teams dropped to East Midlands/Leicestershire 4 until that division was cancelled at the end of the 1995–96 season.

The league ran for two spells between 1992–96 and 1998–00.  At the end of the 1999–00 season it was cancelled for the second time following the splitting of the East Midlands and Leicestershire leagues and all teams transferred into East Midlands 2.

Original teams

When this division was introduced in 1992 as part of a merger of the East Midlands and Leicestershire leagues it contained the following teams:

Antsey - transferred from Leicestershire 2 (4th)
Burbage - transferred from Leicestershire 2 (7th)
Bedford Swifts - transferred from East Midlands 2 (5th)
Bugbrooke - transferred from East Midlands 2 (6th)
Colworth House - transferred from East Midlands 2 (8th)
Deepings - transferred from East Midlands 2 (7th)
Old Newtonians - transferred from Leicestershire 2 (3rd)
Old Northamptonians - transferred from East Midlands 2 (4th)
Old Wellingburians - transferred from East Midlands 2 (10th)
Oundle - transferred from East Midlands 2 (9th)
Shepsted - transferred from Leicestershire 2 (5th)
West Leicester - transferred from Leicestershire 2 (6th)
Westwood - transferred from East Midlands 3 (champions)

East Midlands/Leicestershire 3 honours

East Midlands/Leicestershire 3 (1992–1993)

The original East Midlands/Leicestershire 3 was a tier 11 league.  Promotion was to East Midlands/Leicestershire 2 and relegation to East Midlands/Leicestershire 4.

East Midlands/Leicestershire 3 (1993–1996)

The top six teams from Midlands 1 and the top six from North 1 were combined to create National 5 North, meaning that East Midlands/Leicestershire 3 dropped another level to become a tier 12 league.  Promotion continued to East Midlands/Leicestershire 2 and relegation to East Midlands/Leicestershire 4.  The division was cancelled at the end of the 1995–96 season due to the splitting of the East Midlands and Leicestershire leagues.

East Midlands/Leicestershire 3 (1998–2000)

East Midlands/Leicestershire 3 returned after an absence of several seasons as a tier 11 league.  Promotion was to East Midlands/Leicestershire 2 and there was no relegation.  At the end of the 1999–00 campaign the league was cancelled for the second time and all teams transferred into East Midlands 2.

Number of league titles

Kempston (2)
Bedford Swifts (1)
Corby (1)
Old Northamptonians (1)
Oundle (1)

Notes

See also
East Midlands/Leicestershire 1
East Midlands/Leicestershire 2
East Midlands/Leicestershire 4
Midlands RFU
East Midlands RFU
Leicestershire RU
English rugby union system
Rugby union in England

References

External links
 East Midlands Rugby Union official website
Leicestershire Rugby Union website

11
Rugby union in Bedfordshire
Rugby union in Cambridgeshire
Rugby union in Leicestershire
Rugby union in Northamptonshire
Sports leagues established in 1992
Sports leagues disestablished in 2000
Sports leagues disestablished in 1996
Sports leagues established in 1998